Bačka is a historical region in Serbia and Hungary.

Bačka or Backa may also refer to:

Bačka (Gora), Dragaš, Kosovo
Bačka (village), a village in Slovakia
Backa, Gothenburg, Sweden
Backa Theatre, Gothenburg, Sweden
Eparchy of Bačka
FK Bačka (disambiguation), Serbian football teams

See also
Baca (disambiguation)
Bača (disambiguation)
Bacca (disambiguation)